Kashmir: Symphonic Led Zeppelin is an instrumental album inspired by Led Zeppelin songs. The music was arranged by Jaz Coleman, and performed by the London Philharmonic Orchestra under Peter Scholes.

Track listing

References

Led Zeppelin tribute albums
1997 albums
Albums produced by Youth (musician)
London Philharmonic Orchestra albums
Point Music albums
Albums produced by Jaz Coleman